2011–12 FIS Cross-Country World Cup was a multi-race tournament over the season for cross-country skiers. It was the 31st official World Cup season in cross-country skiing for men and women. The season began in Sjusjøen, Norway, on 19 November 2011 and concluded on 18 March 2012 in Falun, Sweden.

This season's biggest event was the Tour de Ski, as there were no World Championships or Olympic Games.

Calendar

Men

Women

Men's team

Women's team

Men's standings

Overall

Women's standings

Overall

Nations Cup

Points distribution
The table shows the number of points won in the 2011–12 Cross-Country Skiing World Cup for men and women.

A skier's best results in all distance races and sprint races counts towards the overall World Cup totals.

All distance races, included individual stages in Tour de Ski and in World Cup Final (which counts as 50% of a normal race), count towards the distance standings. All sprint races, including the sprint races during the Tour de Ski and the first race of the World Cup final (which counts as 50% of a normal race), count towards the sprint standings.

In mass start races bonus points are awarded to the first 10 at each bonus station.

The Nations Cup ranking is calculated by adding each country's individual competitors' scores and scores from team events. Relay events count double (see World Cup final positions), with only one team counting towards the total, while in team sprint events two teams contribute towards the total, with the usual World Cup points (100 to winning team, etc.) awarded.

Achievements

First World Cup career victory

Men
, 23, in his 4th season – the WC 2 (Sprint C) in Ruka; also first podium
, 23, in his 5th season – the WC 33 (3.75 km F) in Falun; first podium was 2008–09 WC 26 (50 km C Mass Start) in Trondheim
, 21, in his 4th season – the WC 34 (15 km F Handicap Start) in Falun; also first podium

Women
, 21, in her 4th season – the WC 7 (Sprint F) in Rogla; first podium was 2008–09 WC 7 (Sprint F) in Düsseldorf
, 26, in her 9th season – the WC 9 (Sprint F) in Milan; first podium was 2009–10 WC 15 (Sprint C) in Canmore

First World Cup podium

Men
, 29, in his 8th season – no. 3 in the WC 1 (15 km F Individual) in Sjusjoen
, 23, in his 4th season – no. 1 in the WC 2 (Sprint C) in Ruka
, 23, in his 4th season – no. 2 in the WC 20 (Sprint C) in Drammen
, 21, in his 4th season – no. 1 in the WC 34 (15 km F Handicap Start) in Falun

Women
, 24, in her 5th season – no. 3 in the WC 3 (Sprint F) in Düsseldorf
, 25, in her 2nd season – no. 3 in the WC 12 (Sprint F) in Moscow
, 26, in her 6th season – no.2 in the WC 19 (Sprint C) in Lahti

Victories in this World Cup (all-time number of victories as of 2011–12 season in parentheses)

Men
 , 8 (18) first places
 , 6 (24) first places
 , 3 (4) first places
 , 3 (4) first places
 , 2 (10) first places
 , 2 (5) first places
 , 2 (2) first places
 , 2 (2) first places
 , 1 (13) first place
 , 1 (11) first place
 , 1 (10) first place
 , 1 (3) first place
 , 1 (3) first place
 , 1 (2) first place
 , 1 (2) first place
 , 1 (2) first place
 , 1 (1) first place
 , 1 (1) first place

Women
 , 17 (69) first places
 , 11 (33) first places
 , 2 (5) first places
 , 5 (9) first places
 , 2 (2) first places
 , 1 (1) first place

Footnotes

References

 
FIS Cross-Country World Cup seasons
World Cup 2011-12
World Cup 2011-12